Shirley may refer to:

Arts and entertainment
Shirley (novel), an 1849 novel by Charlotte Brontë
Shirley (1922 film), a British silent film
Shirley (2020 film), an American film
Shirley (album), a 1961 album by Shirley Bassey
"Shirley" (song), a 1958 song by John Fred and the Playboys
Shirley (TV series), a 1979 TV series

People
Shirley (name), a given name and a surname
Shirley (Danish singer) (born 1976)
Shirley (Dutch singer) (born 1946), Dutch singer and pianist

Places

United Kingdom
Shirley, Derbyshire, England
Shirley, New Forest, a location near Bransgore in Hampshire
Shirley, Southampton, a district of Southampton, Hampshire, England
Shirley, London, in Croydon
Shirley, West Midlands, England

United States
Shirley, Arkansas
Shirley, Illinois
Shirley, Indiana
Shirley, Maine
Shirley, Massachusetts, a New England town
Shirley (CDP), Massachusetts, the main village in the town
Shirley, Minnesota
Shirley, Missouri
Shirley, New York, a hamlet in Suffolk County
Shirley, Erie County, New York, a hamlet
Shirley Plantation, an estate in Virginia
Shirley, West Virginia
Shirley, Wisconsin

Elsewhere
Shirley, New Zealand, a suburb of Christchurch
Shirley Island, Antarctica
Shirleys Bay, in the Ottawa River, Ontario, Canada

Transportation
Shirley railway station (England), in Shirley, West Midlands, England
Shirley station (MBTA), in Shirley, Massachusetts, US
Shirley, a California station on the Atchison, Topeka and Santa Fe Railway Valley Division, US

Other uses
Shirley (horse), an American Thoroughbred racehorse
Shirley Institute, a cotton and textile research centre in Manchester
Shirley Wind, a wind farm in Wisconsin, United States

See also
Shirley & Company, a 1970s disco group
Shirley's World, a 1971 sitcom
Upper Shirley (disambiguation)